Maria Gontowicz-Szałas (born 23 February 1965) is a Polish judoka. She competed in the women's lightweight event at the 1992 Summer Olympics.

References

1965 births
Living people
Polish female judoka
Olympic judoka of Poland
Judoka at the 1992 Summer Olympics
Sportspeople from Gorzów Wielkopolski